The Manitoba Party was a political party in Manitoba, Canada.  It was formed in 1998, and fielded twelve candidates in the 1999 provincial election, none of whom came close to being elected.  It attempted to contest the 2003 election as well, but was not able to find the five candidates needed for official ballot status.  It is possible that some independent candidates in 2003 were actually representatives of the Manitoba Party.

The Manitoba Party advocated fundamental changes to the province's political system in the 1999 campaign, referring to the existing government structure as an "elected dictatorship".  It promoted greater grass-roots participation, and claimed that any MLAs it elected would be allowed to vote according to the wishes of their constituents, rather than an official party line.

The party also promised debt reduction and lower taxes, and was particularly concerned with the plight of farmers in the province's southwestern corner.  The general orientation of the MP may be described as right-wing and populist, though it is unclear if the party articulated any positions on social issues.

Roger Woloshyn was the party's leader throughout its existence.  In 2000, its President was Brian Hanslip.

See also  
Canadian political parties

References

Provincial political parties in Manitoba
Political parties established in 1998
1998 establishments in Manitoba
1998 in Canadian politics
2000s disestablishments in Manitoba